Edward "Ned" Maddrell (20 August 187727 December 1974) was a fisherman from the Isle of Man who, at the time of his death, was the last surviving native speaker of the Manx language.

Early life
Maddrell was born at Corvalley, near Cregneash on the Isle of Man, on 20 August 1877 to fisherman Thomas Maddrell and his wife Margaret Watterson. He spoke English until he moved to the village of Cregneash to live with relatives. It was here that Maddrell learned Manx, as his great-aunt Margaret Taubman could not speak English. Although Manx had begun to disappear as a community language for most of the Isle of Man in the second half of the 19th century, it lingered on slightly longer in some more remote areas such as Cregneash. Maddrell recalled having to act as an interpreter for the older inhabitants of the village who could not speak English.

At the age of 14 Maddrell began working as a cook on a fishing boat, sailing from Port St Mary to Kinsale in Ireland and to Shetland off Scotland in search of herring.

He married Mary Margaret Skelly of Croit-e-Caley on 3 January 1906.

Irish Folklore Commission recordings
Irish Taoiseach Éamon de Valera visited the Isle of Man in the summer of 1947. The Taoiseach had been instrumental in setting up the Irish Folklore Commission in 1935, which recorded living and dying Irish dialects, but also folklore and customs. During his trip to the Isle of Man, de Valera met Ned Maddrell at Harry Kelly's cottage in the village of Cregneash.

As a result of his trip, the Taoiseach organised for Kevin Danaher of the Irish Folklore Commission to record the last remaining native speakers of Manx, as the Manx Museum did not have the facilities or funds to do so. Danaher travelled to the Isle of Man on 22 April 1948 with a crate of fragile acetate discs to record the Manx language. Maddrell, as well as several other elderly speakers, can be heard speaking or reciting songs in the recordings.

Legacy
Following the death of Sage Kinvig (–1962), Maddrell was the only remaining person who could claim to have spoken Manx Gaelic from childhood, although at the time some other people spoke it as a second language, having learned it later in life. (According to one source, Maddrell had some knowledge of English before he learned Manx, and learned Manx from his great-aunt.)

Maddrell recorded some of his speech for the sake of linguistic preservation; for example, in 1948 he recorded the following about fishing (in Manx, with the English translation):

 
 "Ballooilley" said to him:
 
 "Are the crabs crawling, Joe?"
 
 "Not much, not much," said Joe. "They're very scarce."

A newspaper article about the decline of Manx from about 1960 (Maddrell's age was given as 82) mentions and quotes him, since at the time he was, along with Kinvig, one of only two native speakers:

Maddrell appears to have enjoyed his minor celebrity status, and was very willing to teach younger language revivalists such as Leslie Quirk and Brian Stowell.

The Manx language has undergone a revival since his death, partly thanks to the support that Ned Maddrell gave to younger learners of the language toward the end of his life. Today he is remembered by an annual lecture on Celtic language survival hosted by Culture Vannin and Yn Çheshaght Ghailckagh.

See also
 Dolly Pentreath, the last native speaker of Cornish
 List of last known speakers of languages

References

External links

 The recordings of Ned Maddrell made in 1964 by Brian Stowell RBV
 

1877 births
1974 deaths
Last known speakers of a language
Manx language
Manx people